Mazzo may refer to:

 Mazzo di Valtellina, Italian commune in Piedmont
 Mazzo (surname), Italian surname

See also 

 Mazza (disambiguation)
 Mazo (disambiguation)